Broo may refer to:
 Broo Brewery, an Australian beer company
 Broo, a race of fictional monsters from the role-playing game setting Glorantha
 Broo, a fictional sheepdog puppy character on the TV show The Raccoons
 Broo, a fictional mutant of the Brood alien race appearing in Marvel comic books

See also 
 Brew (disambiguation)
 Bro (disambiguation)
 Bru (disambiguation)